Fontanelle is a city in Summerset Township, Adair County, Iowa, United States. The population was 676 at the time of the 2020 census.

History
Fontanelle was platted in 1855, by New York state native James C. Gibbs (1820–1907),Adair County History 1976  who followed the arrival of a transient named Collins. In the summer of that year, Gibbs purchased lots on the northeast of the city square where he constructed a large log cabin. He brought his family there to live. Gibbs ran a hotel out of the log cabin briefly. He died in 1907, aged 86, and is buried with his wife, Phebe, in Fontanelle Cemetery.

D. M. Valentine purchased lots immediately to the west of Gibbs', thus becoming the second settler.

The city is named for chief Logan Fontanelle of the Omaha tribe, son of the French fur trader Lucien Fontanelle of the American Fur Company and an Omaha tribeswoman.

Geography
Fontanelle is located at  (41.289995, -94.562230).

The local terrain is rolling with a few ravines near the streams. The east branch of the Nodaway River enters Fontanelle in its northwest quadrant.

Demographics

2010 census
As of the census of 2010, there were 672 people, 304 households, and 164 families living in the city. The racial makeup of the city was 99.7% White, 0.1% from other races, and 0.1% from two or more races. Hispanic or Latino of any race were 0.6% of the population.

There were 304 households, of which 25.7% had children under the age of 18 living with them, 44.1% were married couples living together, 7.2% had a female householder with no husband present, 2.6% had a male householder with no wife present, and 46.1% were non-families. 41.4% of all households were made up of individuals, and 22.7% had someone living alone who was 65 years of age or older. The average household size was 2.11 and the average family size was 2.89.

The median age in the city was 48.2 years. 22.2% of residents were under the age of 18; 3.8% were between the ages of 18 and 24; 20.2% were from 25 to 44; 27.4% were from 45 to 64; and 26.3% were 65 years of age or older. The gender makeup of the city was 47.6% male and 52.4% female.

2000 census
As of the census of 2000, there were 692 people, 305 households, and 186 families living in the city. The racial makeup of the city was 99.42% White, and 0.58% from two or more races. Hispanic or Latino of any race were 0.58% of the population.

There were 305 households, out of which 23.0% had children under the age of 18 living with them, 51.5% were married couples living together, 7.2% had a female householder with no husband present, and 38.7% were non-families. 35.1% of all households were made up of individuals, and 22.0% had someone living alone who was 65 years of age or older. The average household size was 2.11 and the average family size was 2.70.

20.2% were under the age of 18, 7.2% from 18 to 24, 19.4% from 25 to 44, 18.9% from 45 to 64, and 34.2% were 65 years of age or older. The median age was 48 years. For every 100 females, there were 76.5 males. For every 100 females age 18 and over, there were 76.4 males.

The median income for a household in the city was $31,328, and the median income for a family was $39,861. Males had a median income of $30,000 versus $20,550 for females. The per capita income for the city was $16,352. About 3.6% of families and 5.8% of the population were below the poverty line, including 10.7% of those under age 18 and 4.8% of those age 65 or over.

Education
Nodaway Valley Community School District serves the community. It was formed on July 1, 2000, by the consolidation of the districts of Greenfield and Bridgewater–Fontanelle. Nodaway Valley High School is the joint high school.

Media
The city's newspaper is The Fontanelle Observer, which now has a page on the website of the Creston News Advertiser. The office of the Observer is on 5th Street.

Defunct newspapers include The Fontanelle Register (established in 1862) and The Fontanelle Reporter (1879).

Churches
There are two churches in Fontanelle: a United Methodist and an Emmanuel Lutheran, established in 1874.

Cemeteries
Fontanelle contains six active cemeteries. They are: Bryant Cemetery, Fontanelle Cemetery, Old Union Cemetery, Pleasant Grove Cemetery, Prussia Cemetery and Sears Cemetery. Cutler Cemetery (also known locally as Mormon Cemetery) is an abandoned pioneer burial ground. It sits in the middle of a pasture, fenced off and marked with a sign by the landowner. Only seven headstones remain.

Notable people
Clel Baudler, politician
Donald D. Clayton, astrophysicist
Henry Winfield Haldeman, physician who practised in the town

References

Gallery

Cities in Adair County, Iowa
Cities in Iowa
1855 establishments in Iowa
Populated places established in 1855